"I Can't Win for Losin' You' is a song written by Robert Byrne and Rick Bowles and recorded by American country music artist Earl Thomas Conley.  It was released in November 1986 as the second single from the album Too Many Times.  The song was Conley's twelfth number one country single.  The single went to number one for one week and spent a total of thirteen weeks on the country chart.

Critical reception
Kip Kirby of Billboard magazine reviewed the song favorably, saying that Conley "slips into a breathy, soulful voice in this R&B-flavored lament; underneath a devil-may-care exterior, he's paying dues for a love that got away."

Charts

Weekly charts

Year-end charts

References

1986 singles
1986 songs
Earl Thomas Conley songs
Songs written by Robert Byrne (songwriter)
RCA Records singles
Song recordings produced by Mark Wright (record producer)
Songs written by Rick Bowles